Amir Abedzadeh (born 26 April 1993), known as Amir, is an Iranian professional footballer who plays as a goalkeeper for Segunda División club Ponferradina and the Iran national team.

Club career

Youth teams
Abedzadeh was a member of the Persepolis Youth Academy from 2006 to 2007, having previously trained under his father since he was 7. He moved to the United Kingdom at the age of 15, and after spending two months with the third-tier outfit of Brentford and taking part in a trial with Arsenal, he joined Tottenham Hotspur's academy team in 2009. Abezadeh left Tottenham in the same year, following their signing of Italian goalkeeper Mirko Ranieri.

During his time in the UK, Abedzadeh also played for amateur youth teams Dinamo Dorigo, London Tigers, and Persian FC, the latter of the G.E. Roberts Enfield Football Alliance League.

United States
Abedzadeh was unable to obtain a work permit in UK and after briefly returning to Iran and training with Iran Pro League side Steel Azin, where his father was a coach, to keep himself on form, he moved to the United States in 2011, and signed for the Los Angeles Blues in the USL Championship, where his father was an assistant coach. He made his debut on 7 June 2011, playing for Los Angeles Blues U-23 (LA Blues' reserve team) in a USL Premier Development League game against Orange County Blue Star. He made eight saves but conceded five goals, and was also shown a yellow card.
In 2012, he had the option to join Chivas USA of Major League Soccer, but he decided to extend his contract with the Blues.

Persepolis
Abedzadeh signed a three-year contract with Persepolis on 15 July 2012. He played for Persepolis U21 in AFC Vision Asia U-21 Tehran Premier League. He scored a goal for Persepolis U21 in game with Niroye Zamini U21. Abedzadeh left the Persepolis in 2014 and without playing a single game for the club.

Rah Ahan
On 3 July 2014, Abedzadeh joined Rah Ahan with signing a four-year contract. He worked under the supervision of his father, Ahmad Reza Abedzadeh who also worked at Rah Ahan as goalkeeping coach. He played his first professional match on 19 September 2014 against his former team Persepolis, where he came in as a substitute of injured Igor Nenezić in 34th minute. He was released by Rah Ahan at the end of the 2014–15 season.

Marítimo
Abedzadeh signed with Portuguese Primeira Liga club Marítimo on 23 January 2017 after good performances with Barreirense  in the Campeonato de Portugal. He became the second Iranian goalkeeper to sign for the club after Alireza Haghighi who played for the club in 2016. He made his first appearance in September 2017 in a Portuguese League Cup match.

He made his debut in the Taça de Portugal on 14 October 2017 in a third round match against GDU Torcatense. Abedzadeh kept a clean sheet and was named man of the match, as Marítimo won the match 1–0.

During his career in Portugal, he was selected as the best goal keeper of Primeira Liga in many occasions.

Ponferradina
Abedzadeh joined SD Ponferradina on 7 July 2021 making him the first Iranian to play for the club.

International career

Abedzadeh was once called up to Iran national under-17 football team's camp for 2009 FIFA U-17 World Cup in Kish Island, but never invited again.

About his playing probability in Iran national under-23 football team, Abedzadeh said:
"Again, they told me that they wanted to take the players who have been together for a long time and know each other well... They also explained that if we should qualify, they are going to call in and examine new players . So hopefully they can beat Iraq and qualify for the Olympics, and hopefully I'll get my chance then. I think the problem is that I was in England for the past four years and that they weren't able to watch me play as much as the local players. That has been pretty disappointing for me."

Abedzadeh was part of Iran's team for in 2014 AFC U-22 Championship, but he did not play any match. In 2015, he was invited to Olympic team for 2016 AFC U-23 Championship qualification.

Senior

On 5 November 2017, Abedzadeh was called into the Iran national team for the first time for friendlies against Panama and Venezuela. In June 2018, he was named in Iran's final squad for the 2018 FIFA World Cup in Russia.
He made his debut against Uzbekistan on 19 May 2018.

Personal life
He is the son of former Iranian national team legendary goalkeeper Ahmad Reza Abedzadeh.

Career statistics

Club

International
Statistics accurate as of match played 23 September 2022 .

Honours
Persepolis
Iran Pro League: runner-up 2013–14
Hazfi Cup: runner-up 2012–13
Iran U-23
WAFF U-23 Championship: 2015

References

External links

1993 births
Living people
Sportspeople from Tehran
Iranian footballers
Association football goalkeepers
Orange County SC players
OC Pateadores Blues players
Persepolis F.C. players
Rah Ahan players
F.C. Barreirense players
C.S. Marítimo players
SD Ponferradina players
USL League Two players
USL Championship players
Persian Gulf Pro League players
Campeonato de Portugal (league) players
Primeira Liga players
Segunda División players
Iran international footballers
2018 FIFA World Cup players
2019 AFC Asian Cup players
2022 FIFA World Cup players
Iranian expatriate footballers
Iranian expatriate sportspeople in the United States
Iranian expatriate sportspeople in Portugal
Iranian expatriate sportspeople in Spain
Expatriate soccer players in the United States
Expatriate footballers in Portugal
Expatriate footballers in Spain